José Joaquín Puello de Castro (Santo Domingo, 1805/1808–ibid., 23 December 1847) was a general and government minister from the Dominican Republic. He and his brothers, Gabino and Eusebio, were the only prominent black Dominicans in the Dominican War of Independence.

Biography 
Puello was former colonel in the Haitian Army; when the Independence was proclaimed on 27 February 1844 he was made part of the Central Independent Government (CIG) since he was very popular among mulattoes and blacks in order to allay fears and rumors regarding an alleged restoration of slavery by the independence plotters.  Before the involvement of Puello and his afro-descendant brothers with the secret society of La Trinitaria organized by Juan Pablo Duarte to attain its independence from Haiti, the majority of the population of African descent considered it a white supremacists organization because it was composed strictly of white middle class Dominican men. Juan Pablo Duarte's uncle suggested he should reach out to prominent Black leaders to gain the confidence of the people and help make the movement a reality. Therefore, Duarte made the important connection with Los Puellos who helped make the independence of the nation a reality. He was suggested by General Pedro Santana, and then, appointed by the CIG, as Military Commander of Santo Domingo.

On 16 July 1844, General Pedro Santana led a coup d'état and assumed the CIG’s Presidency. Puello’s refusal to face the coup against President Francisco del Rosario Sánchez favored the victory of the coup. President Santana appointed him as minister of Treasury and Commerce and promoted him to the rank of General. Following the ratification of the first constitution in November 1844, Puello was made governor of the Santo Domingo Province.

In the 1845 Haitian invasion, Puello had an important role in the Battle of Estrelleta that forced the Haitian retreat. However, his alignment with the liberals gained him enemies among the conservative-ruled government; the Consul of France, Eustache Juchereau de Saint-Denys, called him prejudiced against France and an enemy of the whites.

The Puello brothers were indicted on charges of instigating an anti-white revolution in the country and ingratitude to the white race; they were judged in absentia. José Joaquín and Gabino were sentenced to death by the twenty-five-man jury and executed by a firing squad on 23 December 1847; Eusebio was sentenced to three years in prison and the loss of his military rank (Lieutenant Colonel), however, shortly after he was released and reinstated into the military.

References

Further reading

1800s births
1847 deaths
19th-century rebels
19th-century Dominican Republic people
People from Santo Domingo
Afro-Dominican (Dominican Republic)
Dominican Republic independence activists
Dominican Republic revolutionaries
Dominican Republic military leaders
People of the Dominican War of Independence
Government ministers of the Dominican Republic
Dominican Republic governors
People executed by the Dominican Republic
People executed for treason
People executed by firing squad